A Match Made in Heaven is a 1997 television film inspired by actual events. It is about a dying widow who plays matchmaker to her 32-year-old unmarried son and sets him up with a nurse that she meets. The film stars Olympia Dukakis, John Stamos and Kelly Rowan.

Plot
Thomas "Tom" Rosner (Stamos) is a successful lawyer and happens to be a good catch. However, his unmarried state is the greatest sorrow of his mother, Helen (Dukakis), who is a cancer patient.

As Helen visits the hospital for a check-up, she encounters her doctor's new nurse, Jane Cronin (Rowan), a single woman who is hesitant to meet someone new after getting out of a five-year relationship. She is taken by Jane's beauty, compassion, intelligence and sense of humor, and immediately decides that she is the one for her son. Helen plays matchmaker between the two of them, much to the chagrin of her longtime caretaker, Katie Beale (Reese).

Tom and Jane decide to humor Helen by going out on a date, but Tom is wrong in assuming that Jane likes him. In turn, Jane tells Helen that her date was "the worst social experience since the dawn of man." Undeterred, Helen manages to convince Jane to go out with Tom again. The second date goes successfully, but this time, Tom is afraid to commit because he feels he isn't the kind of man Jane's looking for.

Helen succeeds in making her son see Jane again by employing jealousy, but just as things are going well between the couple, she learns that her cancer is back. This fuels her determination to finally get Tom to settle down with Jane, which frustrates Katie into telling her that she is meddling so much with her son's life that she is not allowing him to move on and live it on his own. Meanwhile, a torn-apart Tom goes back to his old ways and meets a girl at a bar who he reluctantly takes home with him.

Jane encounters the girl and flees Tom immediately. Tom becomes withdrawn and depressed, not only because of Jane, but also because of his mother's illness.

Meanwhile, as Helen's condition worsens, she begins to realize that she is not going to be around forever to look after her son.

Cast
Olympia Dukakis as Helen Rosner
John Stamos as Thomas "Tom" Rosner
Kelly Rowan as Jane Cronin
Della Reese as Katie Beale
Mitchell Whitfield as Gordon Rosner
Stephanie Erb as Allyce Rosner
Karen Ludwig as Priest
Renée Taylor as Isobel Slotkin
Liz Sheridan as Ruthie Klein
Estelle Getty as Betty Weston 
Lance E. Nichols as Mort Paulson
Gene Wolande as Husband
Dale Raoul as Geraldine Burke
Kevin Spirtas as Bruce
William Bassett as Sam Landry

External links

1997 films
1997 television films
American television films
Films scored by Don Davis (composer)
Films about lawyers
American films based on actual events
Films directed by Paul Wendkos
1990s English-language films